Kristina Bakarandze (born 19 May 1998) is a Georgian-born Azerbaijani footballer footballer, who plays as a midfielder for Turkish Women's Super League club Galatasaray. Born in Georgia, she is a member of the Azerbaijan women's national team.

Private life 
Kristina Bakarandze was born in Georgia. She studied economics at Shota Meskhia Zugdidi State University (ZSU) in Zugdidi.

Club career 
Bakarandze moved to Azerbaijan and was a member of the FK Zaqatala team from 2013 to 2015. For the 2015–16 season, she moved to the Baku-based club Neftçi PFK. She then returned to her previous club FK Zaqatala, where she played between 2016 and 2017.

In July 2017, she signed a contract for six months with the Kazakhstani team FC Okzhetpes.

Hakkarigücü Spor 
She joined Hakkarigücü Spor in southeastern Turkey on 18 October 2018 to play in the Turkish Women's First Football League.

ALG Spor 
Bakaradze transferred to the Gaziantep-based club ALG Spor end October 2021. She enjoyed the 2021-22 Women's Super League champion title of her team.

Galatasaray 
On 13 September 2022, the Turkish Women's Football Super League team was transferred to the Galatasaray club.

International career 
Bakarandze became part of the Azerbaijan women's national under-17 football team, and debuted in the match against Austria of the 2014 UEFA Women's Under-17 Championship qualification – Group 8 on 2 August 2013. She appeared in two matches of the 2015 UEFA Women's Under-17 Championship qualification – Group 3. She scored one goal in the 2015 UEFA Development Tournament held in Shymkent, Kazakhstan. She capped in total 13 times and scored two goals for the national U-17 team.

She then became a member of the Azerbaijan women's national under-19 football team. She participated in the 2015 Baltic Women's U-19 Cup. She played in three matches of the 2016 UEFA Women's Under-19 Championship qualification – Group 3, in two matches of the 2016 UEFA Women's Under-19 Championship qualification – Elite round, and in three matches of the 2017 UEFA Women's Under-19 Championship qualification – Group 8.  She scored two goals for the national U-19 team.

She was selected to the Azerbaijan women's national under-21 football team for two friendly matches in 2015.

In June 2017, she was called up to the training camp of the Azerbaijan women's national football team.

International goals

Career statistics 
.

Honours 
 Turkish Women's Super League
 ALG Spor
 Winners (1): 2021-22

See also 
List of Azerbaijan women's international footballers

References 

1998 births
Living people
People from Zugdidi
Women's association football midfielders
Women's footballers from Georgia (country)
Expatriate women's footballers from Georgia (country)
Georgian emigrants to Azerbaijan
Naturalized citizens of Azerbaijan
Azerbaijani people of Georgian descent
Azerbaijani women's footballers
Azerbaijan women's international footballers
Azerbaijani expatriate footballers
Azerbaijani expatriate sportspeople in Kazakhstan
Expatriate women's footballers in Kazakhstan
Azerbaijani expatriate sportspeople in Turkey
Expatriate women's footballers in Turkey
Hakkarigücü Spor players
ALG Spor players
Turkish Women's Football Super League players
Galatasaray S.K. women's football players